The Master of Library and Information Science (MLIS), also referred to as the Master of Library and Information Studies, is the master's degree that is required for most professional librarian positions in the United States. The MLIS is a relatively recent degree; an older and still common degree designation for librarians to acquire is the Master of Library Science (MLS), or Master of Science in Library Science (MSLS) degree. According to the American Library Association (ALA), "The master’s degree in library and information studies is frequently referred to as the MLS; however, ALA-accredited degrees have various names such as Master of Information Studies, Master of Arts, Master of Librarianship, Master of Library and Information Studies, or Master of Science. The degree name is determined by the program. The [ALA] Committee for Accreditation evaluates programs based on their adherence to the Standards for Accreditation of Master's Programs in Library and Information Studies, not based on the name of the degree."

Admission to MLIS, programs normally require holding a bachelor's degree in any academic discipline and library schools encourage applications from people with diverse academic backgrounds.

In the United Kingdom, it is more common for a vocational degree in library and information science to bear the standard designation MA or MSc. In most Commonwealth universities, bachelor's and master's programs have been merged to create the MLIS/MLISc degree. IFLA committees have discussed global standards for librarian credentials.

In Canada, ALA-accredited schools of library and information science sometimes grant MI (Master of Information) degrees, though some institutions retain the designation "MLIS" or "MISt". However, regardless of the name of the degree conferred, virtually every school of library and information studies in Canada comprises programming for library science, information science, archives, and museum studies.

Schools

The MLIS or MLS degree is usually acquired from an accredited library school. ALA accredits 65 programs at 60 institutions across the United States, Canada, and Puerto Rico. ALA also offers an overview of international degrees in library and information science.

The ALA website provides "Guidelines for Choosing a Master's Program in Library and Information Studies"  and discusses how to decide whether a master's degree or an associate's degree will best help you meet your career goals. Prospective and current students will find more information on school selection and academic success on websites like LibraryCareers.org and Hack Library School.

Many ALA-accredited programs provide distance-learning opportunities for students through a variety of delivery methods (e.g. online courses). In some cases, students can complete the entire program at a distance; in other cases, some on-campus courses or regional residency may be required.

Curriculum

The MLIS/MLS curriculum can vary widely. Typically, both theoretical and practical components are included. A comprehensive measurement of the library student's mastery of the field occurs during the last semester of the program and consists of a research project, often tied to a practicum or internship, or a master's thesis. Some schools have stringent course requirements while others are more flexible and offer a wide variety of electives.

Core courses typically focus on the methods of organizing information (including established cataloging and library classification systems), the philosophy and ethics of information dissemination (including reference services, privacy rights, and balancing the needs of various stakeholders: publishers, the public, and the government), and the principles of establishing and managing physical and digital resources, particularly physical and digital libraries, archives, and museums.

The "Information Science" component of the degree is composed of the acquisition of technology skills similar to those found in a computer science or related degree program. Courses in the program that focus on information science and computer science include: data science, data analytics, and data management; institutional repository management; digital libraries and digital preservation; information systems and information architecture; networking hardware and software skills required to manage a computer network; integrated library systems utilizing relational databases and database design; mastery of multiple computer programming languages; web design, metadata and semantic web technologies; automation and natural language processing (NLP); informatics; as well as taxonomy (general), and ontology (information science).

Most programs offer at least one statistics-driven course in research methodology for those aspiring to the Ph.D. as well as management courses for those hoping to progress to leadership positions within libraries.

Students frequently have an opportunity to specialize in one or more aspects of library and information science. It is common for these types of librarians to hold dual master's degrees. They may choose specializations that serve law and medical institutions and their higher education equivalents, law school and medical school. Most law librarians are required to hold both a master's degree in the library field as well as a law degree (the Juris Doctor, or J.D.). Law librarians often work in a specialized law library, law office, or within a government agency. They often have advanced knowledge of law library classification systems (including the Moys Classification Scheme outside the U.S.) and government documents. Medical librarians often hold an undergraduate degree in a pre-medical field such as biology. Like the law librarian, they may have a second master's degree, often a Master of Public Health (MPH). Some additionally hold a practicing medical credential, such as a Registered Nurse (RN). Medical librarians can also acquire an advanced medical librarian credential that is commonly required for medical library directors in the U.S., called the Academy of Health Information Professionals (AHIP) credential, offered through the Medical Library Association. In their careers, medical librarians are often expected to gain clinical experience working in a hospital environment or academic experience within a medical school. Specializations like archival science, heritage studies, and museum studies are closely tied to the history professions; therefore, an undergraduate or graduate degree in history can be especially valuable. Another specialization is K–12 librarianship. The curriculum for this specialization varies significantly from the others by focusing on developing the student's knowledge of educational principals (pedagogy) and the acquisition of skills to meet state educational requirements pertaining to child learning development. School librarians need to acquire state certification prior to being hired. An undergraduate or graduate degree in education and being a certified teacher is often a desired, but not required, qualification.

Careers
People who earn MLIS degrees take on many different roles in many different kinds of environments—in libraries and "beyond the stacks." According to the ALA, "Librarians work in museums, hospitals, businesses, and public libraries. In their work, librarians research, instruct, and connect people to technology. Librarians build websites, digitize archives, and manage social media. Librarians work with people of all ages, connecting them to information, learning and the community." The association's LibraryCareers.org site collects information about library and information science careers, work environments, and more.

Many with MLIS degrees use their professional skills in positions without "librarian" in the job title. The San Jose State University School of Information publishes an annual research report on emerging career trends for information professionals, providing a snapshot of job titles in the field.

Professional organizations
American Library Association (ALA)
Australian Library and Information Association (ALIA)
Canadian Library Association (CLA) 
Chartered Institute of Library and Information Professionals (CILIP)
International Federation of Library Associations and Institutions (IFLA)
Society of American Archivists (SAA)
Special Libraries Association (SLA)

Each of these organizations includes various divisions and/or interest groups that focus on particular specialties or interests.

See also
Library school
Library science
List of library science schools

References

External links
List of ALA-accredited library schools
List of ALIA-accredited library schools
List of CILIP-accredited library and information schools

Library science education
Professional titles and certifications
Library and Information Science